Hernán Darío Pellerano (born 4 June 1984) is an Argentine professional footballer who plays for Argentine club San Martín de Tucumán as a centre-back.

Club career

Vélez
Born in Buenos Aires, Pellerano made his senior debut in 2003 for Club Atlético Vélez Sarsfield, going on to quickly establish as an important first-team element; in 2005 he was part of the squad that won the Clausura, even though he was a substitute for Fabricio Fuentes and Maximiliano Pellegrino (he played only one game as a starter). 

Pellerano became a regular after the former's departure, appearing in 15 matches in the 2005 Apertura tournament.

Almería
In the 2008–09 season, Pellerano moved abroad, signing with UD Almería for a fee of around €3 million. He scored on his official debut for the Andalusians, a 3–1 La Liga away win against Athletic Bilbao on 31 August 2008, and was a regular starter in his first campaign.

Pellerano struggled heavily with injury in the following years, making just eight league appearances in 2010–11 as the club eventually finished 20th and last. He returned to his country for the following season, agreeing to a loan deal at Newell's Old Boys.

Tijuana / Return to Argentina
In 2014, Pellerano joined Club Tijuana of the Liga MX, where he shared teams with his brother Cristian. After one year in Mexico, he returned to Vélez for the 2015 campaign.

On 11 July 2015, Pellerano transferred to Club Atlético Independiente.

International career
In 2006, Pellerano was part of an Argentina-based national squad picked by Alfio Basile to train for the 2007 Copa América. However, he was not finally called for the tournament's final stages.

Personal life
Pellerano's older brother, Cristian, was also a professional footballer. They were teammates at Club Tijuana.

Honours

Club
Vélez Sarsfield
Argentine Primera División: 2005 Clausura

LDU
Ecuadorian Serie A: 2018

References

External links
Vélez Sarfield official profile 
Argentine League statistics  

1984 births
Living people
Footballers from Buenos Aires
Argentine footballers
Association football defenders
Argentine Primera División players
Club Atlético Vélez Sarsfield footballers
Newell's Old Boys footballers
Club Atlético Independiente footballers
La Liga players
Segunda División players
UD Almería players
Liga MX players
Club Tijuana footballers
Paraguayan Primera División players
Club Olimpia footballers
Ecuadorian Serie A players
L.D.U. Quito footballers
San Martín de Tucumán footballers
Peruvian Primera División players
FBC Melgar footballers
Argentine expatriate footballers
Expatriate footballers in Spain
Expatriate footballers in Mexico
Expatriate footballers in Paraguay
Expatriate footballers in Ecuador
Expatriate footballers in Peru
Argentine expatriate sportspeople in Spain
Argentine expatriate sportspeople in Mexico
Argentine expatriate sportspeople in Paraguay
Argentine expatriate sportspeople in Ecuador
Argentine expatriate sportspeople in Peru